Mats Wilander was the defending champion, but lost in the third round to Ronald Agénor.

Ivan Lendl won the title, defeating Guillermo Pérez Roldán 2–6, 6–4, 6–2, 4–6, 6–4 in the final.

Seeds

  Ivan Lendl (champion)
  Mats Wilander (third round)
  Boris Becker (first round)
  Yannick Noah (quarterfinals)
  Kent Carlsson (semifinals)
  Andrés Gómez (quarterfinals)
  Anders Järryd (third round)
  Martín Jaite (first round)
  Andre Agassi (quarterfinals)
  Joakim Nyström (first round)
  Emilio Sánchez (first round)
  N/A
  Mikael Pernfors (first round)
  Guillermo Pérez Roldán (final)
  Claudio Mezzadri (second round, retired)
  Aaron Krickstein (second round)

Draw

Finals

Top half

Section 1

Section 2

Bottom half

Section 3

Section 4

References

External links
 ITF tournament edition details

Men's Singles